Ungur is a Romanian surname. Notable people with the surname include:

 Adrian Ungur (born 1971), Romanian football player
 Adrian Ungur (born 1985), Romanian tennis player
 Liana Ungur (born 1985), Romanian tennis player

Romanian-language surnames
Ethnonymic surnames